Gyalidea is a genus of crustose lichens in the family Gomphillaceae. It has 50 species.

Species
Gyalidea asteriscus 
Gyalidea austrocoreana 
Gyalidea corticola 
Gyalidea diaphana 
Gyalidea fritzei 
Gyalidea fructicola 
Gyalidea fuscoclavata  – South America
Gyalidea goughensis  – Tristan da Cunha
Gyalidea hensseniae 
Gyalidea hyalinescens 
Gyalidea izuensis  – Japan
Gyalidea koreana 
Gyalidea lecideopsis 
Gyalidea luzonensis 
Gyalidea mayaguezensis 
Gyalidea oosumiensis  – Japan
Gyalidea pisutii 
Gyalidea poeltii 
Gyalidea polyspora  – Europe
Gyalidea rivularis 
Gyalidea ropalosporoides 
Gyalidea roseola 
Gyalidea subminuta 
Gyalidea subscutellaris 
Gyalidea vezdae 
Gyalidea vonkonratii

References

Ostropales
Lichen genera
Ostropales genera
Taxa described in 1966
Taxa named by Antonín Vězda